Soundtrack to the Struggle (stylised as Soundtrack to the Struggle...) is the second studio album by British rapper Lowkey. It was released on 16 October 2011 independently on the Lowkey-founded label Mesopotamia Music. It is the follow-up to his 2008 album Dear Listener. Four singles were released to promote the album from 2009 to 2010. Production for the album took place during 2009 to 2011 and was handled by Red Skull, Big G, Nutty P, K-Salaam, Last Resort, Show N Prove, among others. It includes guest appearances from Immortal Technique, Mai Khalil, M1, Black the Ripper, Klashnekoff, and more. The album entered the UK Albums Chart at number 57 on 23 October 2011 – becoming Lowkey's first national chart entry. It is regarded as one of the greatest albums in the UK hip-hop scene.

Background 
Music videos were created for the songs "Something Wonderful", "Obama Nation", "Cradle of Civilisation", "Blood, Sweat and Tears", "Million Man March", "Terrorist?", "My Soul", "Too Much", "Obama Nation Pt. 2" and "Hand on Your Gun" prior to the release of the album, while visuals for "Soundtrack to the Struggle" and "Dear England" were released after the release.

While discussing the name of the album to BBC Radio 1Xtra presenter Charlie Sloth, Lowkey said: "It comes from my position in the game is as an artist, trying to do my thing independently. It is a struggle – it's not easy. We have barriers placed in front of us at every single level. And so we have to fight for everything we get. As an artist I've never had anything put on a plate for me. I've had to struggle to put my music out there." And also added that; "it's about the widest struggle that I am part of, which what I feel is to wake people up to the humanity of people that we are encouraged to ignore every day." On the subject of the album, Lowkey commented that: "The album has just got a lot of heartfelt music that is really and truly an expression of me. Say I died tomorrow, I want this album to be the last thing I say to the world and I want people to remember it and to recognize it as me. No one else."

Track 8 off the album, "Dreamers", premiered on BBC Radio 1Xtra on 24 September 2011. Lowkey described the meaning of the song: "The track is about people with mental illness. Because I've known people that have issues with mental illnesses and is quite common. Like I say at the beginning there is people that see things that aren't there, and ask why not. Because they see further than a lot of people that are perceived as normal." Track 22, "Obama Nation (Pt. 2)" samples a lyric from the political hip hop song "Words I Never Said" by Lupe Fiasco, which Lowkey got permission to use via the social networking and microblogging service Twitter by Lupe.

Singles 
From 2009 to 2010 three singles were released from the album. The first single, "Voices of the Voiceless" featuring American rapper Immortal Technique, was released on 16 August 2009 (Amazon) and 21 September 2009 (iTunes) for digital download. The next single, "Long Live Palestine", released on 16 December 2009 (Amazon) and 1 January 2010 (iTunes). A sequel to "Long Live Palestine" was released together with Part 1 as an EP on iTunes but Part 2 is not included on the album. "Something Wonderful", was released as the third single on 10 February 2010 (Amazon) and 1 March 2010 (iTunes) and the fourth single "Obama Nation" released on 8 April 2010 on Amazon, and was later released on iTunes on 3 May 2010.

Commercial performance 
Soundtrack to the Struggle performed well in the download charts. The album's highest digital peak in the UK currently stands at number 8, number 52 in Canada, number 69 in Australia and #79 in the US. On iTunes the album charted in the Hip Hop Album Chart; debuting at #1 in the UK, #3 in Canada, #4 in Australia and #8 in the US. The album was expected charted at #33 in the national UK Albums Chart (compiled by The Official Charts Company) according to the midweek chart of 19 October 2011 but didn't manage to chart in the Top 40 – entering at number 57. In the UK Download Chart, Soundtrack to the Struggle peaked higher than its UK Albums Chart position – at number 14. And in the UK R&B Chart, the album received its highest OCC position, number 6. In the UK Indie Chart, the album peaked at number 9.

Track listing 
The official track listing released in May 2011.

Notes
 "Obama Nation (Pt. 2)" is unavailable on digital versions of the album.
  signifies an additional producer
 All tracks mixed and mastered by Guy Buss.

Sample credits
 "Soundtrack to the Struggle" contains a sample of "Change Right Now", written and performed by Mavado
 "Too Much" contains elements of "Take Too Much", written and performed by Lauryn Hill
 "Voice of the Voiceless" contains samples of "A Fantastic Piece of Architecture", written and performed by Bloodrock
 "Hand on Your Gun" contains a sample of "A Gringo Like Me", as performed by Peter Tevis
 "Something Wonderful" contains elements of "You Do Something To Me", as performed by Paul Weller
 "Dreamers" contains a sample of "To Zion", written and performed by Lauryn Hill
 "Obama Nation, (Pt. 2)" contains a sample from "Words I Never Said", written and performed Lupe Fiasco
 "Everything I Am" contains a sample of "The Colors of the Night", as performed by Lauren Christy
 "We Will Rise" contains the melody from "A Song from a Secret Garden" by Dreamcatcher
 "Dear England" uses the hook and melody of "In a manner of speaking...love" by Novelle Vague

Music videos 
Soundtrack to the Struggle
Too Much
Hand on Your Gun
Terrorist?
Something Wonderful
Obama Nation
Cradle of Civilisation
Blood, Sweat and Tears
Long Live Palestine
My Soul
Obama Nation (Pt. 2)
Dear England
Million Man March

Charts

Release history

References 

2011 albums
Lowkey albums